Árni Helgason (c. 1260 – 21 January 1320;) was an Icelandic Roman Catholic clergyman, who became the eleventh bishop of the Icelandic diocese of Skálholt in 1304. He served until his death in 1320.

See also
List of Skálholt bishops

References

14th-century Roman Catholic bishops in Iceland
1260 births
1320 deaths
14th-century Icelandic people